The AFL Europe Championship is an Australian football competition played between European national teams. The European Championship is played in a full traditional 18-a-side format (formerly 16-a-side) unlike the Euro Cup which has a 9-a-side format. It is organised by AFL Europe and held every three years. 

Players are not paid to participate. Eligibility is similar to the Australian Football International Cup with national team representatives restricted to nationals - citizens who were resident in the country between the ages of 10 and 16.

The inaugural competition was played in Sweden and Denmark in August 2010. The 2013 championships were held in Ireland in August 2013. A women's division was added in 2016 which was won by host nation Great Britain.

Results

Men's Division

Team performance

See also
 Euro Cup (AFL)
 AFL European Combine

References

External links

Australian rules football competitions in Europe